Grace Harriet Spofford ( – ) was an American music educator.  She was director of the music school of the Henry Street Settlement from 1935 to 1954. 

Her interest in music came early, playing with a piano at age three. By seven she was taking music lessons, and her childhood music education was guided by her sister, contralto Harriet M. Newman.    

In 1905, Spofford graduated from Haverhill High School.  She initially attended Mount Holyoke College, studying piano under William Churchill Hammond.  Due to the lack of college credit for music study and the domestic work required of students, Spofford transferred from Mount Holyoke to Smith College, where she studied with Edwin Bruce Story and Henry Dike Sleeper.  After graduating in 1909, she studied with Richard B. Platt in Boston for a year, then taught piano at Heidelberg University in Tiffin, Ohio from 1910 to 1912, giving public recitals in both places.

She spent the next twelve years in Baltimore at the Peabody Conservatory of Music.  She earned teacher’s certificates in piano (1913) and organ (1916).  She taught piano for several years and served as executive secretary of the Peabody from 1917 to 1924.  She developed a lifelong friendship with Peabody colleague Elizabeth Coulson. They lived together and co-authored the 1916 book A Guide for Beginners in Piano Playing.  Spofford also wrote music criticism for the Baltimore Evening Sun. She later wrote that her performing career was cut short by a ganglion cyst she attributed to over practicing, but "I was rather 'bossy' anyway, and loved administrative work."

In 1924, she became the dean of the newly opened Curtis Institute of Music in Philadelphia, where she established the curriculum and started an international scholarship program.  She was forced to resign in 1931 after a conflict with director Josef Hofmann.

Spofford moved to New York City and held a variety of jobs, including running a radio and music counselling service in the Steinway Building, serving as executive secretary of Olga Samaroff’s Layman’s Music Courses, and managing the Curtis String Quartet and other acts.  She was a music lecturer at the Katharine Gibbs School from 1936 to 1959 and associate director of the New York College of Music from 1934 to 1938.

Spofford's most notable job was as director of the music school of the Henry Street Settlement.  In 1935 she replaced ousted founding director Hedi Katz.  The school provided access to music education for the underprivileged, including future music professionals as well as students moving on to non-musical careers.  The teaching staff included leading musicians and teachers from Juilliard School and the Curtis Institute.  A highlight of her tenure there was a two-act opera she commissioned from composer Aaron Copland for Henry Street students.   The Second Hurricane premiered at the school in 1937.  The libretto was by Edwin Denby and it was conducted by Lehman Engel and staged by Orson Welles.

Spofford retired in 1954.  In retirement she represented the United States and over 20 international conferences, including the conference which created the International Society for Music Education.  She chaired the music committees of the International Council of Women (1954–1963) and the National Council of Women of the United States (1953–1964), and was a delegate to the UNESCO International Music Council.

Grace Harriet Spofford died of a heart attack on June 5, 1974 in a New York City nursing home.

References 

Created via preloaddraft
1887 births
1974 deaths
Curtis Institute of Music faculty
Peabody Institute alumni
American music educators
Mount Holyoke College alumni
Smith College alumni